Mar Shimun Bar Sabbae (died Good Friday, 345) was Bishop of Seleucia-Ctesiphon, from Persia, the de facto head of the Church of the East, until his death. He was bishop during the persecutions of King Shapur II of the Sasanian Empire of Iran, and was executed along with many of his followers. He is revered as a saint in various Christian communions.

Biography
Shimun Bar Sabbae was born the son of a fuller. In 316, he had been named coadjutor bishop of his predecessor, Papa bar Gaggai, in Seleucia-Ctesiphon (now al-Mada'in). He was later accused of being a friend of the Roman emperor and of maintaining secret correspondence with him. On that basis, Shapur II ordered the execution of all Christian priests. Because they would not convert to Zoroastrianism, Shimoun was beheaded with several thousands, including bishops, priests, and faithful. These include the priests Abdella (or Abdhaihla), Ananias (Hannanja), Chusdazat (Guhashtazad, Usthazan, or Gothazat), and Pusai (Fusik), Askitrea, the daughter of Pusai, the eunuch Azad (Asatus) and several companions, numbered either 1150 or 100.  Sozomen, a historian of the 5th century maintained that the numbers registered were 16,000 of the martyrs. Another historian, Al-Masoudy from the 10th century, held that there were killed around 200,000 Assyrians. They are commemorated on:
April 21 in the Catholic Church,
the Friday after Easter in the Syriac Orthodox Church
April 17 in the Greek Orthodox Church,
April 30 in the Melkite Greek Catholic Church
August 17 in the Assyrian Church of the East

References
Holweck, F. G. A Biographical Dictionary of the Saints. St. Louis, MO: B. Herder Book Co., 1924.

Year of birth missing
345 deaths
4th-century archbishops
4th-century Christian martyrs
Patriarchs of the Church of the East
Assyrian Church of the East saints
People executed by the Sasanian Empire
Christians in the Sasanian Empire
Eastern Catholic saints
4th-century bishops
Bishops of Seleucia-Ctesiphon